is an English trusts law case, concerning the construction of a trust to benefit people, rather than a purpose.

Facts
Mr. Patrick Osoba had left his wife and family property in Nigeria and elsewhere. It was given to his wife "for her maintenance and for the training of my daughter, Abiola, up to university grade and for the maintenance of my aged mother". It was argued by a son from another marriage that the trust for the daughter was invalid, since it could be regarded as only being for a purpose.

In the High Court, Megarry VC held that the true construction was that the money was held on trust for the wife, daughter and mother, absolutely as joint tenants.

Judgment
Goff LJ upheld the High Court on the main point that the property was given to the daughter on trust absolutely, so nothing resulted to the testator’s estate. Buckley LJ concurred and said the following.

Eveleigh LJ concurred.

See also

 English trust law

References

External links
 

English trusts case law
Court of Appeal (England and Wales) cases
1978 in case law
1978 in British law